Double Haven or Yan Chau Tong is a harbour enclosed by Double Island, Crescent Island and Crooked Island within the north-eastern New Territories of Hong Kong. It is known for its scenery and natural environment, and for the calm seas from which its English name derives. Double Haven contains many deep red coloured rocks because of iron oxide.

Villages in Double Haven
 Lai Chi Wo
 Sam A Tsuen
 Kat O

Islands
Islands within Double Haven include:

 Chap Mo Chau
 Double Island (Wong Wan Chau)
 Fu Wong Chau
 Kat O (Crooked Island)
 Ngo Mei Chau (Crescent Island)
 Pak Ka Chau
 Yan Chau

Conservation
Parts of the haven fall within Yan Chau Tong Marine Park to protect the wildlife of the marine creatures.

Plover Cove (Extension) Country Park was designated in 1979 to protect the ecology of Double Haven. It also forms a major part of Hong Kong Global Geopark, Northeast New Territories Sedimentary Rock Region.The two main ecological features of this area are mangroves and seagrass beds, which are a nursery for marine life.

The Double Haven Special Area covers 0.8 hectare and was designated in 2011. It includes the islets Pak Ka Chau, Yan Chau (both within Double Haven) as well as the islet of Ap Lo Chun and a part of Ap Chau (both within Crooked Harbour). The geology of the area is characterised by sedimentary rocks of the Jurassic and Cretaceous periods.

Transportation
 A ferry service runs between Ma Liu Shui Ferry Pier, which sails across Double Haven on Sunday and public holidays.
 A hiking route from Wu Kau Tang to Lai Chi Wo overlooks Double Haven.

See also
 Hong Kong Global Geopark
 Plover Cove (Extension) Country Park
 Crooked Harbour

References

External links

 Serene and picturesque marine park － Yan Chau Tong

Ports and harbours of Hong Kong
North District, Hong Kong
Hong Kong UNESCO Global Geopark